Sprookjesboom, also known as "The Fairy Tale Tree", "Märchenbaum" and "L'Arbre des Contes", is a computer-animated series for children from the Efteling theme park. The show is produced by the animation studio Motek Entertainment in Amsterdam, based on a concept from Efteling's director, Olaf Vugts. The television program is broadcast daily in several international markets including the Netherlands on TROS and z@ppelin, in Germany on NRW and in Belgium on Ketnet and Club RTL.

Sprookjesboom is similar in theme to DreamWorks' Shrek. It tells the story of the characters that live in the Sprookjesbos, or Fairy Tale Forest, including Cinderella, Little Red Riding Hood, and Tom Thumb. Behind every 5-minute episode is a subtle moral message. Episodes are in Dutch, with some having been translated to German, French and English. The character animation is based on motion capture performance.

A feature-length film titled Sprookjesboom, de Film was released in 2012 and was awarded the 100th Dutch Gouden Film. The film was based on the characters and stories from the series.

Sprookjesbos

In the Efteling theme park there is a puppet theater in the Sprookjesbos (Fairy Tale Forest) where hand puppets of characters from the series are the heroes. There is also a feature-length live musical show based around the characters which is performed in the park.

In 2008 Efteling began to build an interactive tree in the Sprookjesbos, which was opened in 2010. The old oak sits in the Sprookjesbos, opposite The Little Match Girl. The structure is 9 meters wide and 9 meters high.

Episodes

Film
A 3D feature-length film, titled Sprookjesboom de Film, was released on February 15, 2012 in Belgium, and on February 22 in the Netherlands.

References

External links
 
 
 Motek Entertainment
 Efteling

Dutch children's animated fantasy television series
Computer-animated television series
Works based on amusement park attractions